Abigail McKern  (born 1955) is an English actress. She appeared, alongside her father Leo McKern, in the last three series of Rumpole of the Bailey as Rumpole's young pupil Liz Probert. She has also played many other stage and television roles. In 1983, she won the Laurence Olivier Award for Best Actress in a Supporting Role for her portrayal of Celia in As You Like It.

McKern is the daughter of Leo McKern and fellow Australian actor Jane Holland (A Son is Born, 1946), and also has a sister, Harriet.

References

External links 
 

1955 births
Living people
English television actresses
English stage actresses
Actresses from London
Laurence Olivier Award winners
English people of Australian descent